The Nineteenth government of Israel was formed by Menachem Begin on 5 August 1981, following the June elections. Begin included Likud, the National Religious Party, Agudat Yisrael, Tami and Telem in his coalition, which held 63 of the 120 seats in the Knesset, and the cabinet had 17 ministers. On 26 August Tehiya joined the coalition, and the number of ministers rose to 18.

Begin resigned as Prime Minister in August 1983, and Yitzhak Shamir formed the twentieth government on 10 October, which held office until after the 1984 elections.

Cabinet members

1 Died in office.

2 Although Arens was not an MK at the time, he had been elected to the Knesset on the Likud list.

3 Berman resigned from the government due to its attitude towards the Kahan Commission.

3 Abuhatzira resigned from the government after being convicted of larceny, breach of trust and fraud.

References

External links
Tenth Knesset: Government 19 Knesset website

 19
1981 establishments in Israel
1983 disestablishments in Israel
Cabinets established in 1981
Cabinets disestablished in 1983
1981 in Israeli politics
1982 in Israeli politics
1983 in Israeli politics
 19